Francis August Anthony Joseph Janssens (October 17, 1843 – June 9, 1897) was a Dutch-born prelate of the Roman Catholic Church. He served as bishop of the Diocese of Natchez in Mississippi (1881–1888) and as archbishop of the Archdiocese of New Orleans (1888–1897).

Biography

Early life 
Francis Janssens was born on October 17, 1843, in Tilburg, North Brabant in the Netherlands to Cornelius John and Josephine Anne (née Dams) Janssens. He entered the seminary of 's-Hertogenbosch in 1856.  In 1866, Janssens went to the American College at Louvain, Belgium, planning to ultimately do mission work in the United States. 

Janssens was ordained to the priesthood for the Diocese of Richmond on December 21, 1867. Arriving at Richmond, Virginia, in September 1868, he was appointed rector of the cathedral in 1870 and served as vicar general under Bishops James Gibbons and John Joseph Keane.

Bishop of Natchez 
On April 7, 1881, Janssens was appointed the fourth bishop of  the Diocese of Natchez, by Pope Leo XIII. He received his episcopal consecration on May 1, 1881, from Archbishop James Gibbons, with Bishops Thomas Becker and John Keane serving as co-consecrators. During his tenure, Janssens completed construction on the Cathedral of St. Peter the Apostle in Jackson, Mississippi, which had commenced forty years earlier.

Archbishop of New Orleans 
Janssens was appointed by Leo XIII as the fourth archbishop of the Archdiocese of New Orleans on August 7, 1888; he was installed on September 16, 1888. During his tenure, Janssens convened the fifth Archdiocesan Synod in May 1889, founded more than twenty-five new parochial schools, dedicated a new preparatory seminary at Gessen, Louisiana, in September 1891, and established the Catholic Institute for Deaf and Dumb at Chinchuba, Louisiana, in 1890. Janssens significantly reduced the immense debt incurred by Archbishop Napoléon-Joseph Perché; continuing the work of his immediate predecessor Archbishop Francis Xavier Leray, he reduced it from $324,759 to about $130,000.

Janssens' tenure also spanned the period of hardening racial divisions between whites and African-Americans. He once said, "There is nothing in my administration of the Diocese that worries me more than our colored people; to see what is done by the Protestants to capture them and how often they succeed." Believing that a separate parish would keep blacks within the Catholic Church and facilitate black leadership just as it had for Irish and German immigrants, Janssens established St. Katharine's Church in 1895 as the first parish designated for black Catholics; attendance, however, was optional. It was, however, his expressed hope "that anyone might occupy any pew or any seat anywhere in the church."

Janssens died aboard the steamer Creole, bound for New York City, aged 53. He is buried at St. Louis Cathedral in New Orleans.

References

External links
 St. Mary Basilica Archives, Natchez, Mississippi

Episcopal succession

1843 births
1897 deaths
19th-century Roman Catholic archbishops in the United States
Catholic University of Leuven (1834–1968) alumni
American College of the Immaculate Conception alumni
Roman Catholic archbishops of New Orleans
Catholic Church in Louisiana
Catholic Church in Mississippi
Dutch emigrants to the United States
Dutch Roman Catholic missionaries
People from Tilburg
Roman Catholic Diocese of Jackson
Roman Catholic Diocese of Richmond
Roman Catholic bishops in Mississippi
Religious leaders from Virginia